The 2017–18 KHL season was the tenth season of the Kontinental Hockey League. The season started on 21 August 2017 and ended on 22 April 2018.

The league accommodated a 33 day Olympic break, to allow its players to  participate in the 2018 Winter Olympics in February.

Team changes

The Croatian club Medveščak Zagreb relocated back to the Austrian Hockey League, and Russian club Metallurg Novokuznetsk was relegated to the Supreme Hockey League, to bring the total number of KHL teams to 27.

March 2018 KHL announced that two teams going to drop out after this season and next season have 25 teams. Yugra and Lada Togliatti are the teams that will not continue in KHL.

Divisions and regular season format
In this season, like in the 2016–17 season, each team will play every other team once at home and once on the road, giving a total of 52 games (26 at home, 26 on the road), plus 4 additional games (2 at home, 2 on the road) played by each team against rival clubs from its own conference. Thus, each team played a total of 56 games in the regular season.

How the teams are divided into divisions and conferences is shown in the table below.

League standings

Western Conference

Eastern Conference

Gagarin Cup playoffs

Final standings

Player statistics

Scoring leaders

  
As of 1 March 2018

Source: KHL

Leading goaltenders

As of 1 March 2018

Source: KHL

Awards

Players of the Month
Best KHL players of each month.

Milestones

References

External links
 Season schedule 2017–18

 
Kontinental Hockey League seasons
KHL
KHL
KHL